Mikadocephalus is an extinct genus of ichthyosaur. Its remains have been found in Europe, in the Anisian of Switzerland. The type species is Mikadocephalus gracilirostris. In 2021, Bindellini and colleagues considered M. gracilirostris to be a junior synonym of Besanosaurus leptorhynchus.

See also
 List of ichthyosaurs
 Timeline of ichthyosaur research

References

Ichthyosaurs of Europe
Triassic ichthyosaurs
Triassic reptiles of Europe
Anisian life
Ichthyosauromorph genera